Oleg Ismailovich Semyonov-Tyan-Shansky (October 15, 1906 – September 21, 1990) was a Soviet ornithologist, naturalist and a founder of the Lapland nature reserve.

Life and work 
Semyonov-Tyan-Shansky was the son of Ishmael Petrovich, a meteorologist and his wife, who was the daughter of a Moscow physician.  He was a grandson of the explorer Pyotr Semyonov-Tyan-Shansky and a nephew of the entomologist Andrey Semyonov-Tyan-Shansky.  He grew up in Petrograd until 1917, when his family moved to Petrovka in Tambov.  In 1929, the family returned to Leningrad, where his father got work as a meteorologist. 

In 1930, Semyonov-Tyan-Shansky moved to the Kola Peninsula as a research assistant and was then sent to the Lapland reserve to make scientific observations. Here he examined reindeer populations, was involved in the introduction of muskrats and beavers; and wrote several reports. 

During World War II Semyonov-Tyan-Shansky was considered unfit for field service but was enrolled in a reserve rifle regiment and taught English to officers. After the war, he received an Order of the Red Star for his military service.

After the war, Semyonov-Tyan-Shansky worked at Leningrad at the Zoological Institute of the Russian Academy of Sciences, along with his wife, Maria Ivanovna Vladimirskaya, an ichthyologist . The couple went on several expeditions including to the Curonian Spit. In 1951 he worked at the Pechora-Ilych Nature Reserve while the Lapland reserve was denotified. He then worked to restore the reserve which happened in 1965. 

As an ornithologist Semyonov-Tyan-Shansky studied black grouse and studied the hatching of their eggs using a special instrument that he designed.

References 

Soviet biologists
1906 births
1990 deaths
20th-century biologists